Camp Gray is a Catholic summer camp and retreat center located in Reedsburg, Wisconsin.  It is a ministry of the Roman Catholic Diocese of Madison, Wisconsin, and is accredited by the American Camp Association (ACA). Its mission is to "Camp Gray invites people of all ages to encounter Jesus Christ in all creation, experience a fun and vibrant Catholic community, and be challenged to ever more deeply know, love and serve God and neighbor.".

Camp Gray's summer program consists of nine one-week sessions for campers ranging in age from 6-18. Typical camp activities include archery, arts and crafts, and fishing. Camp Gray also serves as a retreat center.

History
In 1953, Monsignor Francis Xavier Gray, pastor of St. Joseph Catholic Parish in Baraboo, Wisconsin, established the camp.  He bought the original  from a local businessman for $400. The original cabins started as ammunition crates from the nearby Badger Army Ammunition Plant.

In the early days, Camp Gray was a boys' summer camp, owned by St. Joseph Parish and directed by the parish priest. Summer camp started in 1958 under Fr. Francis Schmidt's direction.  Four weeks of summer camp for boys were offered, and the counselors were diocesan seminarians.

In 1968 the Catholic Diocese of Madison, Wisconsin, incorporated the camp. In 1980, Fr. Larry Bakke's second summer as director, the first summer session for girls was held. In 1984 Camp Gray held its first co-ed session, and soon after became entirely co-ed. In 1994, Camp Gray hired its first lay director, Jake Czarnik-Neimeyer, who was succeeded in 1997 by Phil DeLong (Czarnik-Neimeyer's Assistant Director from 1994–1996).  At the start of 2008, Jeff and Rebecca Hoeben, as co-directors, replaced DeLong.

References

External links
Camp Gray Web Site

Gray
Catholic Church in Wisconsin
Buildings and structures in Sauk County, Wisconsin
1953 establishments in Wisconsin
Reedsburg, Wisconsin